Feller is a surname. Notable people with the surname include:

 Abraham Feller (1904-1952), American official and UN diplomat
 Anke Feller (born 1971), German retired sprinter
 Bob Feller (1918–2010), American former Major League Baseball pitcher and Hall of Famer
 Carlos Feller (1923–2018), Argentinian operatic bass
 Catherine Feller (born 1939), British actress and educator
 Daniel Feller, American historian
 Dick Feller (born 1943), American country musician and songwriter
 Eugen Viktor Feller (1871–1936), Croatian pharmacist and entrepreneur, father of William Feller
 François-Xavier de Feller (1735-1802), Belgian writer
 Frank Feller (1848-1908), Swiss illustrator and painter
 Georg-Wolfgang Feller (1915-1991), German World War II naval officer, last soldier awarded the Knight's Cross of the Iron Cross
 Harald Feller (1913-2003), Swiss diplomat who saved Hungarian Jews from the Holocaust
 Harald Feller (organist), (born 1951), German organist, choral conductor and composer
 James Happy Feller (born 1949), American former National Football League kicker
 Joachim Feller (1638-1691), German professor at the University of Leipzig
 Jules Feller (1859-1940), Belgian linguist and Walloon militant
 Karl Feller, American trade unionist
 Manuel Feller (born 1992), Austrian alpine ski racer
 Peter Feller (c. 1920-1998), Tony Award-winning American theatrical set builder
 Rose Feller (born 1975), Hungarian artist
 Sébastien Feller (born 1991), French chess Grandmaster suspended from competition for cheating
 Sherm Feller (1918-1994), American musical composer, radio personality and longtime public address announcer for the Boston Red Sox baseball team
 Sid Feller (1916-2006), American musical conductor
 William Feller (1906-1970), Croatian-American mathematician